Northwest Airlines Flight 5 was a flight from Miami International Airport to Minneapolis−Saint Paul International Airport, which, on January 4, 1990, suffered the loss of the number three (starboard) engine at  in mid-flight over Madison, Florida.

The Boeing 727-251, operated by Northwest Airlines, took off from Miami at 08:15 EST on the morning of January 4, 1990. About an hour later, at approximately 09:10 EST, the pilots reported hearing a loud bang towards the rear of the aircraft. The 14-year-old jet continued to fly normally, and the crew, not knowing that an engine had fallen off, flew for almost 50 minutes before carrying out a safe emergency landing at Tampa International Airport at 09:58 EST. The engine, a Pratt & Whitney JT8D-15, was found a day later in a field near Madison, Florida.

After landing, inspection crews found the forward lavatory external seal was missing and had probably been improperly installed, causing a leakage when the plane was pressurized. The missing seal caused frozen chunks of lavatory fluid to be ingested by the number three engine, thus damaging the compressor blades. Upon failure, the engine separated from the aircraft fuselage, as it had been designed to do.

The National Transportation Safety Board (NTSB) determined the probable cause of the incident to be "the failure of company service personnel to properly service the airplane forward lavatory."

See also 

American Airlines Flight 191
El Al Flight 1862
China Airlines Flight 358

References

External links 
 NTSB Brief
 Aviation Safety Network description

5
Airliner accidents and incidents caused by maintenance errors
Airliner accidents and incidents in Florida
Accidents and incidents involving the Boeing 727
Madison County, Florida
Aviation accidents and incidents in the United States in 1990
January 1990 events in the United States
Airliner accidents and incidents involving in-flight engine separations